The 2013 Southern Utah Thunderbirds football team represented Southern Utah University in the 2013 NCAA Division I FCS football season. They were led by sixth year head coach Ed Lamb and played their home games at Eccles Coliseum. This was their second year as a member of the Big Sky Conference. They finished the season 8–5, 5–3 in Big Sky play to finish in a four way tie for fourth place. They received an at-large bid to the FCS Playoffs where they lost in the first round to Sam Houston State.

Media
All Thunderbirds football games were broadcast live on KSUU. They were streamed online at power91radio. All conference road games and all home games not on Root were streamed via Big Sky TV.

Schedule
The 2013 schedule was the first 12-game schedule in Thunderbirds history. Even though the Thunderbirds played 9 conference opponents, only 8 of the games counted as conference games. The series with Sacramento State was scheduled before Southern Utah became a member of the Big Sky and did not count as a conference game for either team.

 Source: Schedule

Game summaries

South Alabama

Sources:

Ft. Lewis

Sources:

Washington State

Sources:

Sacramento State

Sources:

Northern Colorado

Sources:

UC Davis

Sources:

Portland State

Sources:

Eastern Washington

Sources:

Idaho State

Sources:

Weber State

Sources:

Montana State

Sources:

Northern Arizona

Sources:

FCS Playoffs

at Sam Houston State (FCS Playoffs First Round)

Sources:

References

Southern Utah
Southern Utah Thunderbirds football seasons
Southern Utah
Southern Utah Thunderbirds football